In geometry, the small snub icosicosidodecahedron or snub disicosidodecahedron is a uniform star polyhedron, indexed as U32. It has 112 faces (100 triangles and 12 pentagrams), 180 edges, and 60 vertices. Its stellation core is a truncated pentakis dodecahedron. It also called a holosnub icosahedron, ß{3,5}.

The 40 non-snub triangular faces form 20 coplanar pairs, forming star hexagons that are not quite regular. Unlike most snub polyhedra, it has reflection symmetries.

Convex hull 

Its convex hull is a nonuniform truncated icosahedron.

Cartesian coordinates 
Cartesian coordinates for the vertices of a small snub icosicosidodecahedron are all the even permutations of

 (±(1-ϕ+α), 0, ±(3+ϕα))
 (±(ϕ-1+α), ±2, ±(2ϕ-1+ϕα))
 (±(ϕ+1+α), ±2(ϕ-1), ±(1+ϕα))

where ϕ = (1+)/2 is the golden ratio and α = .

See also 
 List of uniform polyhedra
 Small retrosnub icosicosidodecahedron

External links 
 
 

Uniform polyhedra